Polina Aleksandrovna Guryeva (born 5 October 1999) is a Turkmenistani weightlifter. She competed at the 2020 Summer Olympics held in Tokyo in 2021 and won a silver medal in the women's 59 kg competition. This was the first ever Olympic medal for Turkmenistan. 

She is one of the few Turkmens who won Olympic medals, joining the likes of the late Marat Nyýazow (who represented the USSR at the 1960 Olympics in Rome) and Daniyar İsmayilov (an ethnic Turkmen who represents Turkey).

Early life 
Guryeva was born on 5 October 1999 in Ashgabat. She is ethnic Russian. She started to do artistic gymnastics in 2011 in Ashgabat, and eventually moved to weightlifting.

Guryeva is a student of the Turkmen State Institute of Physical Culture and Sports. She lives and trains in Ashgabat; her coach as of 2021 was Artur Emiryan.

For winning the first Olympic medal, the Turkmen State presented Polina Guryeva with a Lexus LX570 Sport Plus car and a new three-room apartment and 50 thousand US dollars.

Major results

State awards 
 Honored Master of Sports of Turkmenistan (August 21, 2021)

References

Living people
Turkmenistan female weightlifters
Olympic weightlifters of Turkmenistan
1999 births
Turkmenistan people of Russian descent
Weightlifters at the 2020 Summer Olympics
Medalists at the 2020 Summer Olympics
Olympic silver medalists for Turkmenistan
Olympic medalists in weightlifting
Sportspeople from Ashgabat